John Michael Bilock (June 20, 1916 – September 8, 1994) was a bishop of the Catholic Church in the United States.  He served as the Auxiliary Bishop of Byzantine Catholic Archeparchy of Pittsburgh from 1973 to 1994.

Early life and education
Born in McAdoo, Pennsylvania, John Michael Bilock was educated at St. Procopius College and Seminary in Lisle, Illinois.  He was ordained a priest on February 3, 1946.

Priesthood
Bilock's pastoral assignments as a priest included St. John the Baptist in Hazleton, Pennsylvania and St. John Chrysostom in Pittsburgh.  In 1955 he became the personal secretary of Bishop Nicholas Elko as well as the secretary to the Board of Consultors.  A year later he became a consultor, and on May 7, 1957 he was named a Papal Chamberlain, with the title of Monsignor, by Pope Pius XII.  In 1963 Bilock was appointed the rector of St. John the Baptist Cathedral in Munhall, Pennsylvania.  Six years later he was named vicar general of the archeparchy, and he was made a Prelate of Honor by Pope Paul VI.

Episcopacy
Pope Paul VI named Bilock as the Titular Bishop of Pergamum and Auxiliary Bishop of Pittsburgh (Ruthenian) on  March 1, 1973. He was consecrated a bishop by Archbishop Stephen Kocisko on May 15, 1973 at Holy Spirit Church in Pittsburgh.  The principal co-consecrators were Bishops Michael Dudick of Passaic and Emil Mihalik of Parma.  Throughout his ministry as priest and bishop, Bilock celebrated the Divine Liturgy weekly over radio station WEDO. After the death of Archbishop Thomas Dolinay he was elected by the Board of Consultors as the Apostolic Administrator of the archeparchy in 1993.  Bilock died of a heart attack on September 8, 1994 at St. Francis Medical Center in Pittsburgh at the age of 78.  His funeral was celebrated at St. John the Baptist Cathedral and he was buried at the Mount St. Macrina Motherhouse in Uniontown, Pennsylvania

References

1916 births
1994 deaths
People from Schuylkill County, Pennsylvania
Religious leaders from Pittsburgh
Ruthenian Catholic bishops
20th-century Eastern Catholic bishops
American Eastern Catholic bishops
20th-century American clergy